Girandola (from Italian) may refer to:

Girandola (candlestick)
Girandola (firework)
Anthony Girandola